Shirazi (also known as Kifunzi, Kifundi or Chifundi) is a coastal village in the Coast Province of Kenya. It is inhabited by people belonging to the Shirazi ethnic group.

References

See also
 Shirazi (ethnic group)

Kwale County
Populated places in Coast Province
Shirazi people